The Sun Will Never Set or Don't Set the Sun Off (translit. La Tutf'e al-Shams) is a 1961 Egyptian romance film. Directed by the Egyptian film director Salah Abu Seif, this film is based on a novel with the same name written by the Egyptian novelist Ihsan Abdel Quddous in 1960 and co-written by Helmy Halim. The film was presented in the Karlovy Vary International Film Festival in 1962 and was selected as one of the best 150 Egyptian film productions in 1996. The film starred Faten Hamama, Imad Hamdi, Nadia Lutfi, Ahmed Ramzy, Shukry Sarhan and Laila Taher.

Plot 

An aristocratic family is torn down after the death of its patriarch. He leaves alone his widow wife and five of his daughters and sons. His eldest son, Ahmed (Shukry Sarhan), takes the role of the man in the house and helps his mother take care of his brother and sisters. Mamdouh (Ahmed Ramzy), his brother, is a self-centered man who refuses to follow his brother's step and decides to make his own decisions in his life. Meanwhile, despite restricting social conventions, Layla (Faten Hamama) falls in love with her piano teacher, a married man who is years older than she is, and marries him. The other two daughters accept their conditions and move on. Layla and Mamdouh's impetuous decisions result in unfortunate consequences. Layla divorces her husband shortly after their marriage and Mamdouh dies in a car accident after a quarrel. Ahmed finds the strength to face his brother's death and enrolls in the army to fight in the war. His sister falls in love with another soldier in the war, and Ahmed himself falls in love with a woman and marries her.

Cast 
Faten Hamama as Layla
Imad Hamdi as Fathi
Shukry Sarhan as Ahmed
Nadia Lutfi as Ahmed's girlfriend and wife
Ahmed Ramzy as Mamdouh
Laila Taher as Nabila

References

External links 

1961 films
1960s Arabic-language films
1961 romantic drama films
Films based on Egyptian novels
Films based on romance novels
Egyptian romantic drama films